Oikonyms in Western, Central, South, and Southeast Asia can be grouped according to various components, reflecting common linguistic and cultural histories. Toponymic study is not as extensive as it is for placenames in Europe and Anglophone parts of the world, but the origins of many placenames can be determined with a fair degree of certainty.
One complexity to the study when discussing it in English is that the Romanization of names, during British rule and otherwise, from other languages has not been consistent.

Common affixes
Common affixes used in South Asian oikonyms can be grouped based on their linguistic origin: (with examples from India, Bangladesh, Pakistan, Nepal, and elsewhere such as in Sanskrit-influenced Indonesia): 

 Dravidian:
wal, wali, wala, warree, vli, vadi, vali, pady and palli hamlet — e.g. Dombivli; Kasan Wala; Sandhilianwali

Kot fort — Pathankot; Sialkot
Patnam, patham, pattana "city", or "city of" — e.g. Visakhapatnam'

Indo-Aryan:
Alay Abode; from Sanskrit ā-laya. e.g. Meghalaya, Lokā-laya (settlement).
Desh village, land, country; from Sanskrit देश (desa) for "country" — e.g. Bangladesh. In Indonesia it becomes Desa which is another Indonesian word for "village". 
Nagar city, land, country, village; from Sanskrit नगर (nagara) — e.g. Ahmednagar. In Indonesian, the word Negara means "country" and the word Nagari is a term used in West Sumatra referring to "village". 
Pur village, town, state, country; from Sanskrit पुर (pura) — e.g. Jamalpur; Kanpur; Khanpur; Janakpur, Jodhpur, Jaipur, Udaipur. In Southeast Asian countries, it is known as pura, e.g. Singapura, and Indonesian cities such as Jayapura, Siak Sri Indrapura, Amlapura, Sangkapura, Semarapura, etc. In Indonesia, pura also refers to a Hindu temple. 
Pindliterally "lump" or a small altar of sand
Garh fortress — Chandigarh

Persian or Arabic:
Abad "dwelling of" or "town of", combined with a person's or group's name (usually the founder or primary inhabitant(s)) — e.g. Ahmedabad; Ordubad; Shirabad; Islamabad; Khorramabad; Mirza Abad; Ashgabad; Jalalabad; Jalal-Abad; Leninabad; Kirovabad; Vagharshapat; Sardarabad; Sardarapat . Being a generic and an ambiguous term referring to small isolated farms, village (but not city) on one hand, and towns and cities, on the other hand. See also abadi (settlement).
Bandar port (wikt:بندر) — e.g. Bandar Abbas; see 
Dasht field, desert (wikt:دشت) — e.g. Hulandasht; see 
Kuy neighborhood (wikt:کوی) — e.g. Kordkuy; see 
Mazar (in various languages) shrine, grave, tomb, etc. (from wikt:مزار), cf. "Mazar (mausoleum)". The placename usually refers to a grave of a saint, ruler, etc.: Mazar-i-Sharif; see 
Mazra or Majra hamlet, also "farm" (wikt:مزرعة,  /maz.ra.ʕa/), "field" (wikt:مزرع,  /maz.raʕ/)
Shahr, shehrcity — e.g. Bulandshahr
Kale, Kaleh, Qala, Qalat, Qila fort, fortres, castle; see also "Qalat (fortress)"
Ganj, gunj, gunge Persian-Urdu, taken to mean neighborhood in Indian context. 
Basti a granted habitat, also sanctuary from the Persian suffix, bastī— e.g. Basti Maluk, Azam Basti, 
Nahri (irrigation) canal
Nahr wikt:نهر, river, e.g., Nahr-e Mian; see 
Dera tent — e.g. Dera Ghazi Khan, Dera Ismail Khan
Gerd or Gerad' گرد یا جرد': گرد Belgrad Stalingerad دارابگرد دستجرد -Stan, Estan'' "a place abounding in...", "place of..." — e.g. Afghanistan; Pakistan

See also
Glossary of Arabic toponyms
Place names in India, for a more in-depth explanation of various place names in India.

References

Sources

Further reading 

 

Toponymy

Oikonyms
English suffixes